Sredne Belaya is a former Russian Air Force airbase located near Srednebelaya, Amur Oblast, Russia.

The base was home to the 194th Guards Military-Transport Aviation Regiment which used the Lisunov Li-2 between 1953 and 1960 and the 825th Independent Helicopter Regiment between 1968 and 1982 with the Mil Mi-8.

References

Russian Air Force bases